Coxcatlán Municipality may refer to:
 Coxcatlán Municipality, Puebla
 Coxcatlán Municipality, San Luis Potosí

See also
 Coxcatlán (disambiguation)

Municipality name disambiguation pages